高田駅 is the name of multiple train stations in Japan:

 Kōda Station (disambiguation)
 Kōda Station (Nagayo)
 Takada Station (disambiguation)
 Takada Station (Nara)
 Takada Station (Niigata)
 Takata Station (disambiguation)
 Takata Station (Fukuoka)
 Takata Station (Kagawa)
 Takata Station (Kanagawa)